Elisabeth Harnois (born ) is an American actress. Her career started at the age of five, where she began appearing in a number of film and television roles. As a child, she starred as Alice in Disney's Adventures in Wonderland and as an adult, she starred as Morgan Brody in the CBS forensics drama CSI: Crime Scene Investigation from 2011 to 2015.

Life and career

Early life
Harnois was born in Detroit, Michigan, to a hairstylist mother and a computer programmer father. She was raised in Los Angeles. She is the eldest of five children with four brothers. She attended St. Mel's School in Woodland Hills and Canyon Springs High School in Moreno Valley, California, and graduated from Wesleyan University with a degree in film studies in 2001.

Career
Harnois appeared in two films at the age of five, One Magic Christmas and Where Are the Children?. She did commercials until landing the role of Emily in Timeless Tales from Hallmark and the role of Alice in the 1992 Disney Channel series Adventures in Wonderland. In 1998, she appeared in My Date with the President's Daughter alongside Boy Meets World actor Will Friedle and 9 to 5 actor Dabney Coleman as part of The Wonderful World of Disney. In 2005, she starred in the short-lived Fox teen mystery/supernatural/horror drama Point Pleasant as Christina Nickson, and also landed a role opposite Evan Rachel Wood in the black comedy/satirical film Pretty Persuasion, portraying the best friend of Wood's character.

In May 2011, Harnois guest-starred in the long-running CBS police procedural drama CSI: Crime Scene Investigation in Season 11, episode 21, titled "Cello and Goodbye", as Morgan Brody, a CSI from the L.A.P.D. Scientific Investigation Division. In September that same year, when the twelfth-season premiere, called "73 Seconds" aired, Harnois was added to the main cast, wherein her character transfers to the Las Vegas Crime Lab. Harnois remained on the show until it ended in September 2015 with the two-hour series finale titled "Immortality".

Awards and nominations
Harnois was nominated in 1987 for the Young Artist Award at the Young Artist Awards for Exceptional Performance by a Young Actress Starring in a Feature Film in Comedy or Drama for One Magic Christmas (1985) and again in 1988 for Best Young Actress Guest Starring in a Television Drama for Highway to Heaven (1987) for the episode "Man's Best Friend". She won the same award in 1993 for Outstanding Performer in a Children's Program for Adventures in Wonderland (1992).

Filmography

Film

Television

References

External links
 
 
 

1979 births
20th-century American actresses
21st-century American actresses
Actresses from Detroit
American child actresses
American film actresses
American television actresses
American voice actresses
Living people
Wesleyan University alumni